HM Prison Coldingley is a Category C men's prison, located in the village of Bisley, in Surrey, England. The prison is operated by His Majesty's Prison Service.

History
Coldingley was opened in 1969 as a Category B training prison. The opening was attended by Lord Stonham, Minister of State at the Home Office.

In 1991 Coldingley was hailed as a flagship prison in England. In 1993 Coldingley was re-designated as Category C training prison.

A report published in 2004, by His Majesty's Chief Inspector of Prisons, criticised the prison for its lack of work and training for inmates, and poor prisoner resettlement programmes.

In 2005, the Howard League for Penal Reform set up a graphic design studio in Coldingley which offers prisoners fully remunerated employment at market rates (now closed).

In July 2011, it was announced that along with several other prisons, Coldingley would be put up for market testing, allowing private companies as well as HM Prison service, to bid for a contract to run the prison.

The prison today
Coldingley consists of 7 wings: Alpha, Bravo, Charlie, Delta, Echo Wing (built October 2008), Foxtrot and Golf. Wings A-D consist of 87 single cells and 3 doubles. Echo Wing also has single cells with a small number of doubles. E Wing houses kitchen Workers, Orderlies & inmates enrolled in the Rehabilitation of Addicted Prisoners Trust (RAPt) course.
E Wing cells have in-cell sanitation and a shower. The other wings all operate on an automated night sanitation system, which can cause problems as inmates get held in queues to use sanitation. Showers facilities are communal.

High wages are not on offer at Coldingley anymore, but inmates can still earn up to £33 a week in the various industries located within the Prison. These industries are: Laundry, Sign Shop, Engineering and Print Shop.

Coldingley also operates a Crime Diversion Scheme (CDS), in which inmates are employed. This scheme involves young first time offenders visiting the prison to hear real inmates tell them the harsh realities of the loss of liberty in the hope that this may prevent them from embarking further towards the possibility of reoffending.

There is a brand new Education block which is slowly reaching its potential, but teaching recruiting is proving a problem, so it may be some time until it reaches its full capacity. The facilities in the education block are of a high standard. The Education department offers numerous courses, such as: Numeracy, literacy, Bookkeeping, Business Enterprise, Art, IT courses (CLAIT), preparation for work and several others.

A brand new gym was completed and opened to inmates in January 2009. The new equipment has already begun to inspire inmates and Prison officers to improve their fitness & health. The gym contains a variety of cardiovascular and weight training machines. 5 treadmills, 4 ergometers, 4 cross trainers, 2 bikes & 2 recumbent bikes (Life Fitness). Inmates are offered 7 gym sessions every fortnight.

Coldingley has a small library, which has a reasonable selection of books.

References

External links
 Ministry of Justice pages on Coldingley
 HMP Coldingley - HM Inspectorate of Prisons Reports

Coldingley
Prisons in Surrey
1969 establishments in England
Coldingley